Timothy Russell may refer to:
Timothy Peter Russell, cricketer
Shooting of Timothy Russell and Malissa Williams